Geyikdere is a village in the Genç District, Bingöl Province, Turkey. The village is populated by Kurds of the Tavz tribe and had a population of 221 in 2021.

The hamlets of Alatlı, Arapcık, Bayırcık, Erdoğdu, Erenler, Ericek, Karabulut, Konuklu, Soluca, Umurlu, Uyanık, Üçkardeş, Yamaçlı and Yuvaklı are attached to the village.

References 

Villages in Genç District
Kurdish settlements in Bingöl Province